Faqir is a masculine given name, and may refer to:

 Faqir Mohammed (born circa 1970), Pakistani Taliban leader
 Faqir Muhammad Khokhar (born 1945), judge of the Supreme Court of Pakistan

See also 
 Al Fakir (disambiguation)
 Fakir (name)

Arabic masculine given names